A human rights film festival is a subject specific film festival that presents films on topics related to human rights. They are a type of activist film festival. Many human rights film festivals show documentary films, however, some also include fiction, animated and short films. The first film festival with the title of a human rights film festival was the Human Rights Watch International Film Festival inaugurated in 1988. Many have emerged since then with the largest being the One World International Human Rights Documentary Film Festival in Prague. Under the stewardship of another prominent human rights film festival, Movies that Matter, the Human Rights Film Network has created a communal circuit of human rights film festivals which work with a guiding Charter towards an atmosphere of support and collaboration. The Human Rights Film Network uses the Universal Declaration of Human Rights as their moral centre. A large majority of the human rights film festivals listed below are members of the Human Rights Film Network.

List

References 

 List
Human rights-related lists
human rights film festivals